FK Bohemians Prague, formerly known as FC Střížkov Praha 9, was a football club from Střížkov, Prague, Czech Republic. The club played two seasons in the Czech First League, attracting controversy for refusing to play a fixture and ultimately receiving a 15-point deduction from the league, coinciding with their relegation.

The club won the Bohemian Football League in the 2006–07 season and the Second League the subsequent season, reaching the First League in 2008, In 2010 the club was relegated from Czech First League. In 2011 the club won the Bohemian Football League again and was promoted to the Czech 2. Liga. In June 2011 the club appointed SK Strakonice 1908 coach František Barát as manager, replacing coach Jaromír Jindráček.

After losing the battle over the naming rights, their owner Karel Kapr took the decision to disband the men's side of the club. Most of the players were transferred to SK Třeboradice. The club decided to continue with an adult women's team and junior male and female teams.

History 
The old name of the club was FC Střížkov Praha 9. The club bought the logo of the traditional team Bohemians Prague in 2005 after the old Bohemians Prague were relegated from Second League to the Bohemian Football League. In 2010 the Prague City Court ruled that the club cannot use the name Bohemians, as it has no connection with traditional Bohemians Prague.

In 2010, Bohemians were deducted 20 points and fined 6 million CZK because they refused to play a league fixture against Bohemians 1905 and accused SK Sigma Olomouc of bribery without presenting evidence and the club was relegated from the Czech First League. In June 2010 the club was not given a license by the football association to play the Second League as the club's officials refused to pay their fine, thus it was automatically relegated to the Bohemian Football League (third-level league). The following season, 2010–2011, the club won the Bohemian Football League and returned to professional football in the Czech 2. Liga.

In September 2012 a Czech court ruled that the club must not continue to use the name Bohemians after 31 January 2013. However, in December 2012, the club was granted the right to appeal against the decision, thus protracting the process yet further.

The club was relegated to the third tier football league, the Bohemian Football League, in 2014 after finishing 15th in the National Football League. They won the division in their first season, but refused the promotion back to the National Football League. On 23 June 2015, the club announced that their leadership had decided to enter the 5th division of Czech football pyramid for the 2015–16 season.

Relation to Bohemians 1905 

In 1993, Bohemians 1905 broke away from the TJ Bohemians Praha sports franchise and became a separate legal entity.  The club functioned normally until financial troubles came up and the club nearly collapsed in 2005.  TJ Bohemians took advantage of the situation and rented out the Bohemians logo to FC Střížkov Praha 9, a lowly team in the third tier of Czech football.  TJ were able to pour money into the small club and help them rise to the first division.  However, fans remained loyal to the Bohemians 1905 team, and helped the large club to recover.

Stadium 

In the 2008–09 Czech First League, Bohemians played its home matches at FK Viktoria Stadion, due to its own stadium in Horní Počernice not meeting league standards.

In the 2009–10 Czech First League, Bohemians was forced to move again due to the league's requirements for under-soil heating and played its home matches at Stadion Evžena Rošického.

In the 2011–12 Czech 2. Liga, after reconstruction work on the ground, Bohemians returned to their home stadium in Střížkov.

Notable former players

Managers 
Luboš Urban (2005–06)
Radim Nečas (2006)
Luboš Urban (2006–09)
Robert Žák (2009)
Jaromír Jindráček (2009–11)
František Barát (2011–12)
Jaromír Jindráček (2012)
Ivan Pihávek (2012–2013)
Miloš Sazima (2013–2016)

History in domestic competitions 

 Seasons spent at Level 1 of the football league system: 2
 Seasons spent at Level 2 of the football league system: 4
 Seasons spent at Level 3 of the football league system: 5
 Seasons spent at Level 4 of the football league system: 0

Czech Republic 

Notes

Honours 
Czech 2. Liga (second tier)
 Champions 2007–08
Bohemian Football League (third tier)
 Champions 2006–07, 2010–11

References

External links 
  
 Team profile at iDNES.cz 

 
Defunct football clubs in the Czech Republic
Association football clubs established in 1996
Association football clubs disestablished in 2016
Czech First League clubs
Football clubs in Prague
1996 establishments in the Czech Republic
2016 disestablishments in the Czech Republic